Phobophorus was a genus of beetle in the family Carabidae with a single species, Phobophorus paccatus. It is now considered a synonym of the genus Amara, subgenus Amathitis.

References

Harpalinae